The Master of the Gubbio Cross was the name given to an Umbrian painter active between about 1285 and about 1320.  He appears to have been familiar with the artists working at the Basilica of San Francesco d'Assisi, and some of his work bears a resemblance to that of Giunta Pisano.

References
Morello, Giovanni and Laurence B. Kanter, ed.: The Treasury of Saint Francis of Assisi.  Milan; Electa, 1999.

13th-century Italian painters
14th-century Italian painters
Gubbio Cross, Master of the
Umbrian painters